Lindø RSC is a Danish rugby club in Munkebo. They function as an independent club, with their own junior teams, but have been playing in combination with RC Odense at senior level since 2010. The club is probably best known as being on the wrong end of a 194–0 scoreline against now-defunct Comet in 1973, which has been noted in the Guinness Book of Records.

History
The club was founded by Bertil Jansson in 1960. From 1997 to 2002 they won the Danish Championships consecutively and have also won eight Danish Cup titles.

Honours
Danish Championships
1997, 1998, 1999, 2000, 2001, 2002

References

External links
Lindø RSC

Danish rugby union teams
Rugby clubs established in 1960